The 17th New Brunswick Legislative Assembly represented New Brunswick between July 17, 1856, and April 1, 1857.

The assembly sat at the pleasure of the Governor of New Brunswick John Henry Thomas Manners-Sutton.

Charles Simonds was chosen as speaker for the house.

List of members

Notes:

References
Journal of the House of Assembly of ... New Brunswick ... July, 1856 ... (1856)

Terms of the New Brunswick Legislature
1856 in Canada
1857 in Canada
1856 establishments in New Brunswick
1857 disestablishments in New Brunswick